Marsha Campbell (born February 13, 1946) is a former American Democrat politician who served in the Missouri House of Representatives.

Born in Princeton, New Jersey, she graduated from the University of Missouri with a bachelor's degree in business and public administration and the University of Missouri–Kansas City with a master's degree in political science.  She has worked as a government relations consultant, as a manager of administration for Jackson County, Missouri, and as a buyer for Macy's and Hallmark Cards.

References

1946 births
Living people
20th-century American politicians
21st-century American politicians
Democratic Party members of the Missouri House of Representatives
People from Princeton, New Jersey
Women state legislators in Missouri
University of Missouri alumni
21st-century American women politicians
20th-century American women politicians